8MMM Aboriginal Radio (8MMM), pronounced "8 Triple M", is an Australian television comedy series that began screening on ABC Television on 29 April 2015. The series is written by Trisha Morton-Thomas, Danielle MacLean and Sonja Dare. It is produced by Morton-Thomas, Rachel Clements, and Anna Cadden and directed by Dena Curtis and Adrian Russell Wills.

The six-part series is set in a remote radio station whose Aboriginal crew air the day-to-day preoccupations of Alice Springs and its surrounds such as housing, education, culture, money, alcohol and reconciliation. The station is run by non-Indigenous people who easily fall into one of three categories – missionaries, mercenaries or misfits – the 3Ms.

Cast
 Shari Sebbens as Jessie
 Ian Meadows as Jake
 Zac James as Jampajinpa
 Laura Hughes as Koala
 Elaine Crombie as Milly
 Geoff Morrell as Dave Cross
Trisha Morton-Thomas as Lola

See also
List of Australian television series
List of Australian Broadcasting Corporation programs

Further reading

References

External links

 Official website
 Production website

2015 Australian television series debuts
Australian Broadcasting Corporation original programming
Australian comedy television series
Television shows set in the Northern Territory
Indigenous Australian television series
Television series about radio